"Lights Out, Words Gone" is the second single by British rock band Bombay Bicycle Club from their third studio album, A Different Kind of Fix. Through Island Records, the single was released on 14 October 2011 as a digital download in the United Kingdom. The song peaked to number 89 on the UK Singles Chart.

Music video
A music video to accompany the release of "Lights Out, Words Gone" was first released onto YouTube on 6 October 2011 at a total length of three minutes and forty-two seconds. The singer
Lucy Rose has also contributed vocals on the song. The music video was filmed in Parque de Santa Lucia in Mérida, Yucatán, Mexico.

Track listing

Chart performance

Release history

References

2011 singles
Bombay Bicycle Club songs